Dwight York is an American criminal.

Other people with the same or similar name include:

 Dwight York (comedian), stand-up comedian
 Dwight Yorke, Trinidad and Tobago footballer
 Dwight A. York, Wisconsin politician

See also
 Dwight Yorke Stadium, Tobago, a football stadium